Bad Vibes may refer to:

Mala onda, a 1991 novel by Alberto Fuguet
Bad Vibes (Lloyd Cole album), 1993
Bad Vibes (Shlohmo album), 2011
 Bad Vibes, a studio album by Shit and Shine
 "Bad Vibes" (K.Flay song)

See also
"Bad Vibe", a 2018 song by English group M.O with Lotto Boyz and Mr Eazi